Nikolaou or Nicolaou is a surname. It is of Greek origin and a very common Greek Cypriot surname. Nicolaou translates to the "Victor of the People". "Niko" or "Nico" is derived from the Greek word "νίκη" for "victor" and "laou" is derived from the Greek word "λαός" which means "the people or the people of the country". Many Greek Cypriot surnames have an "ou" ending in them compared to main land Greece where Nicolaou may be spelt as "Nicolaos". There are two other variations of the surname Nicolaou which were given the prefix   "hadji" (in greek "Χατζη") and the prefix Papa (in greek "παπάς") which was added as a prefix to the surname. Hadjinicolaou or Hatzinikolaou had the prefix "hadji" given to those who physically walked on foot and journeyed to the Holy land and were baptized in the River Jordan and means that at some point someone in the family many years ago was baptized in the River Jordan. Papanicolaou or Papanikolaou has the prefix "papa" given to those whose father had become a priest for the word "παπάς" in greek translates to priest, which means at some point in this person's lineage they have someone who was anointed to a priest.

 Charis Nicolaou (born 1974), Cypriot footballer
 Diamantis Nikolaou (1790–1856), klepht
 Dimitris Nikolaou (born 1989), Greek footballer
 George Nicolaou (born 1945), Cypriot judge
 Giorgos Nicolaou (born 1982), Cypriot footballer
 Ionas Nicolaou (born 1963), Cypriot politician
 Jannis Nikolaou (born 1993), German–Greek footballer
 K. C. Nicolaou, Cypriot-American chemist 
 Konstantia Nikolaou (born 1984), Cypriot shooter
 Lakis Nikolaou (born 1949), Greek footballer
 Marios Nicolaou (footballer, born 1981), Cypriot footballer
 Marios Nicolaou (footballer, born 1983), Cypriot footballer
 Nikolas Nicolaou (born 1979), Cypriot footballer
 Nikos Nikolaou (1909–1986), Greek artist
 Nikos Nikolaou (rower) (born 1923), Greek rower
 Nikos Nicolaou (disambiguation), several people
 Panicos Nicolaou, Cypriot banker
 Ted Nicolaou, American film director, screenwriter and producer

See also 
 Nikolaidis
 Nikolopoulos
 Nicolaos
 Nikolaos
 Hatzinikolaou 
 Hatzinicolaou

Greek-language surnames
Patronymic surnames
Surnames from given names